Chishan Prison, also known as Hunan Provincial No.1 Prison, is a prison in Hunan of the People's Republic of China.

Overview
Chishan Prison is located in Yuanjiang in China's Hunan province. The Prison houses a number of political prisoners and prisoners of conscience. The prison practices reform through labor (known as the Laogai system) with prisoners being forced to work in for profit prison industries. The prison industries of Chishan Prison operate under the names Yuanjiang Electric Machinery Plant and Dongtinghu Farm.

History
In 1995 a letter was smuggled out of the prison written by political prisoner Yu Zhijian and addressed to the National People's Congress which alleged mistreatment and physical violence directed by guards towards prisoners. Chinese authorities questioned the authenticity of the letter but it was believed to be genuine by global NGOs.

As of 2018 prisoners were allegedly forced to work for more than ten hours a day without any days off. This violated Chinese prison regulations which limit work to eight hours a day, five days a week.

Prisoners

Zhang Jingsheng
Zhang Jingsheng is a Chinese singer-songwriter who has composed a number of songs based on his time in Chishan. He is a significant artist of the Prison song genera, a genera of traditional music that predates the Communist takeover. Zhang Jingsheng is alleged by fellow inmates to have been tortured and otherwise mistreated during his time at Chishan.

Zhang Shanguang
Zhang Shanguang is a labor organizer who spent several years in Chishan Prison. He was sentenced to prison in 1989 due to his work organizing the Hunan Workers’ Autonomous Federation. He was released and subsequently imprisoned at Chishan again in 1998 due to having contact with a Radio Free Asia reporter. In 2001 Zhang Shanguang was severely beaten by guards after organizing a petition to end torture and long working hours at the jail.

Yu Dongyue
Yu Dongyue is a Chinese artist arrested for a provocative piece of performance art that insulted Chairman Mao. Yu was transferred to Chishan prison in 1990. In 2004 it was reported that Yu Dongyue had been tortured to the point of mental collapse by Chishan prison authorities.

Shi Tao
Shi Tao is a Chinese journalist and poet who served time in Chishan prison during his ten-year imprisonment which started in 2005.

Li Wangyang
Li Wangyang was a Chinese labor activist who served ten years in Chishan Prison from 2001 to 2011. He was sentenced for "inciting subversion of state power."

Lee Ming-che
Lee Ming-che is a Taiwanese pro-democracy activist imprisoned in Chishan Prison since 2017. In 2018 Lee was transferred to a prison in Hebei before being transferred back to Chishan. From 2017 to 2019 his health deteriorated and he lost 30kg.

See also
 Penal system in China
 Human rights in China

References

Prisons in China
Penal labor in China
Buildings and structures in Yiyang
Yuanjiang